Besides the dictionary definition, furor may refer to:

Furor, a Spanish destroyer which fought in the Battle of Santiago de Cuba during the Spanish–American War
Furor, a musical composition by Juan María Solare